Rastab (also Romanized as Rāstāb; also known as Rāstābād) is a village in Junqan Rural District of Junqan District of Farsan County, Chaharmahal and Bakhtiari Province, Iran. At the 2006 census, its population was 1,676 in 376 households, when it was in Mizdej-e Sofla Rural District of the Central District. The following census in 2011 counted 1,715 people in 470 households, by which time it was in the recently established Junqan District. The latest census in 2016 showed a population of 1,582 people in 453 households; it was the largest village in its rural district and is populated by Lurs.

References 

Farsan County

Populated places in Chaharmahal and Bakhtiari Province

Populated places in Farsan County

Luri settlements in Chaharmahal and Bakhtiari Province